The Hampstead Ferry was a cable ferry in the Canadian province of New Brunswick. The ferry crossed the Saint John River, linking Hampstead on the west bank with Wickham on the east bank.

About
The ferry carried up to 12 cars at a time, and operated from May to November, subject to ice and flood conditions, and between 6 am and midnight. It was operated by the New Brunswick Department of Transportation. In 2009, the New Brunswick Department of Transportation cancelled the Hampstead ferry service.

See also
List of crossings of the Saint John River

References

External links
Official ferries web page of the New Brunswick Department of Transportation

Ferries of New Brunswick
Cable ferries in Canada